"The Frog Prince; or, Iron Henry" (literally "The Frog King or the Iron Henry") is a German fairy tale collected by the Brothers Grimm and published in 1812 in Grimm's Fairy Tales (KHM 1). Traditionally, it is the first story in their folktale collection. The tale is classified as Aarne-Thompson type 440.

Origin

Editions 
The story is best known through the rendition of the Brothers Grimm, who published it in their 1812 edition of Kinder- und Hausmärchen (Grimm's Fairy Tales), as tale no. 1. An older, moralistic version was included in the Grimms' handwritten Ölenberg Manuscript from 1810. Jack Zipes noted in 2016 that the Grimms greatly treasured this tale, considering it to be one of the "oldest and most beautiful in German-speaking regions."

Sources 
The Grimms' source is unclear, but it apparently comes from an oral tradition of Dortchen Wild's family in Kassel. The volume 2 of the first edition of Kinder- und Hausmärchen, published in 1815, included a variation of this story entitled Der Froschprinz (The Frog Prince), published as tale no. 13. As this version was not included in later editions, it has since remained relatively unknown.

It has been postulated by some scholars that parts of the tale may extend back until at least Roman times; an aspect of the story is referred to in Petronius' Satyricon, in which the character Trimalchio remarks, "qui fuit rana nunc est rex" ("The man who was once a frog is now a king"). Other scholars, however, argue that this may actually be a jab at the emperor Nero, who was often mockingly compared to a frog.

Folkorist Stith Thompson suggested that the story of the Frog King in the German tradition began with a 13th-century literary tale written in Latin.

Plot 
In the tale, a spoiled princess reluctantly befriends the Frog Prince, whom she met after dropping a golden ball into a pond under a linden tree, and he retrieves it for her in exchange for her friendship. The Frog Prince, who is under a wicked fairy(or sorcerer)'s spell, magically transforms back into a handsome prince.  In the original Grimm version of the story, the frog's spell was broken when the princess threw the frog against the wall, at which he transformed back into a prince, while in modern versions the transformation is triggered by the princess kissing the frog.

In other early versions, it was sufficient for the frog to spend the night on the princess' pillow.

The frog prince also has a loyal servant named Henry (or Harry) who had three iron bands affixed around his heart to prevent it from breaking in his sadness when his master got under a spell. When the frog prince reverts to his human form, Henry's overwhelming happiness causes all three bands to break, freeing his heart from its bonds.

Variants 
It is Aarne–Thompson type 440. Other folktales similar to the Frog Prince are:

 "The Frog Prince". The first English translation of the above tale. Edgar Taylor, the translator, not only changed the title, but altered the ending in a substantial and interesting manner.
 "The Wonderful Frog" (W. Henry Jones and Lewis L. Kropf, Hungary).
 "The Tale of the Queen Who Sought a Drink From a Certain Well" (J. F. Campbell, Scotland).
 "The Well of the World's End"
 "The Paddo" (Robert Chambers, Scotland).
 "The Maiden and the Frog" (James Orchard Halliwell-Phillipps, England).
 "Oda und der Schlange" (Oda and the Snake) (Ludwig Bechstein, Germany) - a variant where a serpent replaces the frog
 "The Kind Stepdaughter and the Frog" (W. Henry Jones and Lewis L. Kropf, England).
 "The Frog Prince" (H. Parker, Sri Lanka).
 "A Frog for a Husband" (William Elliot Griffis, Korea).
 "The Toad Bridegroom" (Zong In-Sob, Korea).

A similar tale type is ATU 402, "The Animal Bride". In these tales, a female animal (mouse, cat or frog) helps a prince with three tasks and after marrying him, assumes human form. In Puddocky (old word for toad), another German folk tale, and likewise "Tsarevna Lyagushka" (The Frog Princess), a Russian folk tale, the male and female roles of the frog prince are reversed. Prince Ivan Tsarevitch discovers the enchanted female frog, who becomes Vasilisa the Wise, a sorceress.

A possible parallel in Antiquity may be found in the story of Amymone, who was one of the Danaides. She went to fetch water in a jug because of a drought season caused by the gods. A satyr tried to force himself on her, but the god Poseidon rescued her. It has been suggested that the amphibian suitor and the handsome prince may have been separate characters at first.

In a Latvian tale, Little White Dog, a girl is tasked with getting water from a well without getting the bucket wet. A little white dog appears and promises to help her if she accepts him as her bridegroom.

Cultural legacy 
 Adelheid Wette based her 1896 play on "The Frog Prince," although she called it "The Frog King."
 The Frog (1908), directed by Segundo de Chomón, is the first film adaptation of "The Frog Prince".
Margarete Schweikert based her 1913 children's operetta "The Frog King" on the Grimm Brothers' fairytale "The Frog Prince."
 Stevie Smith's poem "The Frog Prince" (1966) suggests the thoughts of the prince as he waits for disenchantment.
 The Frog Prince was a 1971 film starring Kermit the Frog, Trudy Young and Gordon Thomson.
 Anne Sexton wrote an adaptation as a poem called "The Frog Prince" in her collection Transformations (1971), a book in which she re-envisions sixteen of the Grimms' fairy tales.
 Robin McKinley's 1981 collection of short stories The Door in the Hedge contains a version of the tale, entitled "The Princess and the Frog".
 "The Tale of the Frog Prince" was the first story presented by Shelley Duvall's Faerie Tale Theatre in 1982, with Robin Williams as the witty Frog Prince and Teri Garr as the vain princess.
 The Frog Prince is a 1986 film starring John Paragon and Aileen Quinn.
 "The Frog Prince" was one of the fairy tales featured in Grimm's Fairy Tale Classics in its Grimm Masterpiece Theater season (1987).
 "The Frog Prince" was enacted by Achim (Joachim Kaps) and Kunibert (Hans-Joachim Leschnitz) in a 1988 episode of Brummkreisel.
 "The Frog Prince" was one of the episodes of Happily Ever After: Fairy Tales for Every Child
 Linda Medley's graphic novel Castle Waiting from 1996 contains a character named Iron Henry or Iron Heinrich, who has 3 iron bands around his heart to repair the heartbreak he suffered when his son died of a fearful curse.
 In the second episode of Adventures from the Book of Virtues (1996), Plato the Bison and Annie try to convince their friend Zach to tell his father the truth by telling him three stories, including one about "The Frog Prince." In this version, the title character was transformed into a frog for lying to a witch and breaking his promise. He is voiced by Jeff Bennett while the princess is voiced by Paige O'Hara.
 Prince Charming is a 2001 film adaptation of the fairy tale, starring Martin Short, Christina Applegate and Sean Maguire as the title character. The prince is cursed to remain a frog until a maiden breaks his spell, giving him extreme longevity and allowing for the modern setting of the film.
 In Shrek 2, Fiona's father King Harold is secretly the frog prince. However, unlike the fairy tale where the princess meets him as a frog and her actions make him human, he becomes human through a deal with the Fairy Godmother.
 A musical version of The Frog Prince, written by Dieter Stegmann and Alexander S. Bermange, was presented at the Amphitheater Park Schloss Philippsruhe in Hanau, Germany as part of the Brothers Grimm Festival in 2005.
 French graphic novel Garulfo (1992-2002) is a fairy tale about a frog who asks a witch to transform him into a prince - so that he can live life at the top of the food chain.
 Bill Willingham's graphic novel series Fables features many fairytale characters living as refugees in New York, including "Flycatcher" the former Frog Prince, now a janitor and errand boy.
 A chamber opera for children based upon The Frog Prince, written by Jacob A. Greenberg for Brown Opera Productions and the Providence Athenaeum, was performed in 2008.
 The tale was adapted for German television as one of the episodes of fairy tale series Sechs auf einen Streichen ("Six at one Blow"), in the 2008 season. 
 The Princess and the Frog, a 2009 Disney animated film, is loosely based on the 2002 novel The Frog Princess by E. D. Baker. The film starred Anika Noni Rose and Bruno Campos and was directed by Ron Clements and John Musker. The Frog Prince story itself is mentioned several times in the film, being read to Princess Tiana as a child and inspiring the spoiled Prince Naveen (who has been transformed into a frog) to suggest Tiana kiss him to break his spell. However, the kiss fails, turning her into a frog as well.
 Hidden object game series Dark Parables used the tale as basis for its second installment (The Exiled Prince).
 Robert Coover wrote a "reimagined" version of the tale for The New Yorker in 2014.
The Children's Theatre of Cincinnati's Script Development Division adapted the one-act musical Princess & Frog in 2020. The stage musical is adapted from the full-length musical Croaker written by Jason Marks and Debra Clinton.
The English alternative rock band Keane released a song titled "The Frog Prince" within their 2004 UK number-one album Under The Iron Sea.
 "The Frog Prince" is a main character of the "Neverafter" season of the tabletop role-playing game show Dimension 20, in this adaption more often referred to as "Prince Gerard" or his full title "Prince Gerard of Greenleigh". He is played by Brian K. Murphy.

See also 

 The Frog Princess
 The Princess and the Frog
 Puddocky
 The Three Feathers (the female frog as the bride)
The Frog Princess, a novel by E. D. Baker
 Henry F. Urban, author of the play Der Froschkönig

References

Further reading

External links 

 
 Fairyland Illustrated Frog Prince
 Frog Kings: Folktales about Slimy Suitorss
 Archived audio recording of The Frog Prince, recorded as part of an ArtsSmarts educational project
 Frogprince.ca, presents the Frog Prince for kids

 
Grimms' Fairy Tales
Fictional frogs
Fiction about shapeshifting
Fictional kings
Fictional princes
Animal tales
German fairy tales
Male characters in fairy tales
ATU 400-459